The Women's 19m Synchronized Platform event at the 2010 South American Games was held on March 23 at 13:00.

Medalists

Results

References
Summary

10m synchro W